The United States Lighthouse Service, also known as the Bureau of Lighthouses, was the agency of the United States Government and the general lighthouse authority for the United States from the time of its creation in 1910 as the successor of the United States Lighthouse Board until 1939 when it was merged into the United States Coast Guard. It was responsible for the upkeep and maintenance of all lighthouses and lightvessels in the United States.

History

1789–1910
In 1789, the United States Lighthouse Establishment (USLHE) was created and operated under the Department of the Treasury. All U.S. lighthouse ownership was transferred to the government which became the general lighthouse authority (GLA). In 1792, the Cape Henry Lighthouse was the first lighthouse built by the USLHE. In 1822, French physicist, Augustin Fresnel designed the Fresnel lens. In 1841 the Fresnel lens was first used in the United States and installed on the Navesink Lighthouse. In 1852 the Lighthouse Board was created. In 1871, the Duxbury Pier Light became the first caisson lighthouse built in the United States. In 1877, kerosene became the primary fuel for lighthouses, replacing various fuels such as sperm oil, Colza oil, rapeseed oil, and lard oil. In 1884, uniforms came into use by all members of the Lighthouse Board. In 1886, the Statue of Liberty was the first lighthouse to use electricity. In 1898, all coastal lighthouses were extinguished, for the first time in U.S. history, as a precaution during the Spanish–American War. In 1904, the Lightship Nantucket became first U.S. vessel to have radio communication. In 1910, the Bureau of Lighthouses was created and operated as the United States Lighthouse Service (USLHS).

1910–1917
In 1910, 11,713 aids to navigation of all types were around the country. Congress abolished the U.S. Light-House Board and created the Bureau of Lighthouses under the Department of Commerce.

The Board had hired a number of civilians and many of these experienced people took over the roles that the military officers had been playing. Though initially called inspectors, the civilian heads of the districts changed their titles to superintendent. Also at this time, the placement of aids to navigation along rivers had become the responsibility of the Lighthouse Service, and many of these aids were tended on a part-time basis by local citizens called lamp lighters and lamp attendants.

President William Taft selected George R. Putnam to head the new bureau and he gained the title "Commissioner of Lighthouses." For 25 years, Putnam headed the bureau and during his administration, navigational aids saw a substantial increase. New technology was incorporated into the bureau's work, particularly in the area of electric aids and some automation using electricity. Though the number of aids to navigation increased substantially during Putnam's reign from 11,713 to 24,000, mostly buoys and small lights, arguably two of his most significant achievements were the passage of the Retirement Act for lighthouse personnel in 1918 and the introduction in 1921 of the radiobeacon as an aid to navigation. This new technology permitted a reduction of over 800 employees during Putnam's 25 years as head of the bureau.

World War I

During World War I and the period following, several technological advances contributed to the automation of lighthouses, rendering human occupancy unnecessary. A device for automatically replacing burned-out electric lamps in lighthouses was developed and placed in several light stations in 1916. A bell alarm warning keepers of fluctuations in the burning efficiency of oil-vapor lamps was developed in 1917. In the same year, the first experimental radiobeacon was installed in a lighthouse. The only lightvessel of the service sunk by enemy action was the LV-71 on August 6, 1918. After the sinking of the SS Merak by the  near Diamond Shoals, North Carolina LV-71 rescued the survivors but was sunk as well shortly thereafter. Nobody was hurt in the action because the German commander allowed the Americans to evacuate the ship before firing.

1919–1939
The first automatic radiobeacon in the United States began service in 1928. Radiobeacons are still in use today, although most have recently been decommissioned as improved electronic navigational aids have become available. An automatic time clock for operating electric range lights came into use in 1926, and by 1933, a photo electric-controlled alarm device had been developed to check the operation of the unwatched electric light. A lightship staffed by remote control was equipped by the Lighthouse Bureau in 1934. It included a light, fog signal, and radiobeacon, all controlled by radio signals. A battery-powered buoy which gradually replaced the older acetylene buoys, was introduced in 1935. Because of the technological improvements mentioned above, and in particular the radio beacon direction finder, the United States rose from sixth in shipping safety in 1920 to second in 1935, with only the Netherlands holding a better safety record.

Improvements in the road and highway systems provided better and more rapid means of transportation during the 1920s and 1930s. As a result of the improved roadways, the Bureau was able to better maintain aids to navigation, benefiting the service economically. The extension of electric lines into remote sections of the country provided a reliable power source for operating aids to navigation. By the 1920s and 1930s, the majority of light stations had electric service, reducing the number of staff necessary to operate the station. As ancillary buildings at many stations, especially shore stations, were rendered useless, the makeup of the light station began to change.

In 1935, Putnam was followed in the Commissioner's position by a career Lighthouse Service employee, H. D. King, a former district superintendent.

On 1 July 1939, the Service merged with the United States Coast Guard, which has since taken over the maintenance and operation of all U.S. lighthouses and lightships.

World War II
On March 15, 1942 the U.S. Lighthouse Service/U.S. Coast Guard tender Acacia was sunk by the German submarine .

Flags
All of the Lighthouse Services lightships and lighthouse tenders flew the United States Lighthouse Service flag, a triangular flag with a red border featuring a blue lighthouse on a white background. Any Lighthouse Service ship upon which the Superintendent of Lighthouses was embarked also flew the Superintendent of Lighthouses flag, a rectangular flag with a blue border featuring the same blue lighthouse on a white background.

Rank insignia
Rank insignia of officers were as follows in 1918:

See also

Confederate States Lighthouse Bureau

References

Further reading

 Hyde, Charles K., and Ann and John Mahan. The Northern Lights: Lighthouses of the Upper Great Lakes. Detroit: Wayne State University Press, 1995.  .
 Noble, Dennis, Lighthouses & Keepers: U. S. Lighthouse Service and Its Legacy (Annapolis: U. S. Naval Institute Press, 1997)
 Oleszewski, Wes, Great Lakes Lighthouses, American and Canadian: A Comprehensive Directory/Guide to Great Lakes Lighthouses, (Gwinn, Michigan: Avery Color Studios, Inc., 1998) .
 Penrod, John, Lighthouses of Michigan, (Berrien Center, Michigan: Penrod/Hiawatha, 1998)  .
 Penrose, Laurie and Bill, A Traveler’s Guide to 116 Michigan Lighthouses (Petoskey, Michigan: Friede Publications, 1999).  
 
 Putnam, George R., Lighthouses and Lightships of the United States, (Boston: Houghton Mifflin Co., 1933).
 United States Coast Guard, Aids to Navigation, (Washington, DC: U. S. Government Printing Office, 1945).
 
 
 Wagner, John L., Michigan Lighthouses: An Aerial Photographic Perspective, (East Lansing, Michigan: John L. Wagner, 1998)  .
 Weiss, George, The Lighthouse Service, Its History, Activities and Organization (Baltimore: Johns Hopkins Press, 1926)
 Wright, Larry and Wright, Patricia, Great Lakes Lighthouses Encyclopedia Hardback (Erin: Boston Mills Press, 2006) .

External links
 Lighthouses: An Administrative History from the National Park Service
 US Lighthouse Chronology from terrypepper.com
 United States Lighthouses - National Historic Landmarks

Lighthouses in the United States
Lighthouse organizations
Lighthouse Service
1910 establishments in the United States
1939 disestablishments in the United States
Government agencies disestablished in 1939
Government agencies established in 1910